Terreus, a Latin word meaning earth may refer to:
 Aspergillus terreus, a fungus species
 Cryptococcus terreus, a fungus species
 Macrocheles terreus, a mite species